Franciszek Gągor (8 September 1951 – 10 April 2010) was a Polish general, Chief of the General Staff of the Polish Armed Forces between 2006 and 2010.

He died in the 2010 Polish Air Force Tu-154 crash near Smolensk with the President of Poland Lech Kaczyński.

Life and education
Gągor  was  born  in  1951  in  Koniuszowa  near  Nowy Sącz.

He  attended  the  Artillery  Officers'  College at Wrocław in 1973. He also held qualifications at the Adam Mickiewicz University in Poznań (1983 – Master of Arts degree in English philology); the National Defence University in Warsaw (1998 – doctorate in military science); the NATO Defense College (2001), and the National Defense University (2002) in Washington DC.

Military service

He served in the 2nd Tank Regiment in the 1973 as an officer in a Self-Propelled Artillery unit. Afterwards, he became  an  operations  and  executive  officer responsible for planning and operational activities in United Nations missions.

In 1978 he was posted to the Mechanized Infantry Officer College in Wrocław, where he lectured  on  preparations  and  training  of  Polish  contingents  designated  for peacekeeping  operations  until  1988  and,  during  that  time,  took  an  active  part  in 
UNDOF  operations  (1980–1981 and  1985–1986)  as  an  operations  officer.

Between 1988 and 1990 General Gągor served at UNDOF HQ as Deputy Chief of Logistics.

In 1991  he  was an executive officer/second-in-command at the Polish Military Contingent for Desert Storm Operation.  He later became the Deputy Sector Commander of UN Iraq-Kuwait Observation mission UNIKOM between 1991 and 1992.

In 1993, as a Colonel, he became the Chief of Polish Armed Forces Peacekeeping Division of the Polish Armed Forces.

He was a key member of the Polish Armed Forces preparations team for Polish accession to NATO, taking care of initial and first rounds of NATO Defence Planning for Poland.

He was promoted to the rank of brigadier general in 1997. 
In August 2003, he returned to UNDOF after being appointed by then UN Secretary General Kofi Annan as its head of mission and force commander.

On 27 February 2006, Gagor was made  Chief of General Staff of the Polish 
Armed Forces upon appointment by the President of Poland. He was promoted to General on 3 May 2006.

Along with Krzysztof Paszkowski, he wrote the book: "Defense Doctrine of the Polish Republic for Peacekeeping Operations."
Gen. Gągor is an author of numerous articles and publications on military affairs and co-operation, defence transformation and armed forces modernization.

Personal life
He was fluent in English, and communicated in French and Russian. He had an interest in history, English literature, skiing, tennis, volleyball and jogging. He was married to Lucyna and has two children, Katarzyna and Michał.

Medals and decorations
Grand Cross of the Order of Polonia Restituta (2010, posthumously)
Officer's Cross (2005)
Knight's Cross (1998)
Gold Cross of Merit
Gold Medal in the Service of the Armed Forces of the Homeland
Gold Medal of Merit for National Defence
Medal Pro Memoria
Commander of the Legion of Honour (France, 17 December 2008, France)
Commander of the Legion of Merit (USA, 22 May 2008)
Grand Cross of the Order of Merit (Portugal) (1 September 2008)
Grand Cross of the Order of Polonia Restituta
Honorary Badge of Premysl Otakar II, King of Iron and Gold (Čestný badges Přemysl Otakar II., Král železného a zlatého, 1 March 2007, Czech Republic)
Meritorious Service Cross - Military Division (13 April 2011, Canada, posthumously)
Medal of the UN mission in UNEF II
UN Medal UNDOF mission
Medal UN mission evasion
Parachutist badge

References

External links 

 
 NATO Biographies Jan. 08, 2008
 NATO Biographies May 5, 2010

1951 births
2010 deaths
Polish generals
Burials at Powązki Military Cemetery
Grand Crosses of the Order of Polonia Restituta
Recipients of the Gold Cross of Merit (Poland)
UNDOF Force Commanders
Commandeurs of the Légion d'honneur
Commanders of the Legion of Merit
Grand Crosses of the Order of Merit (Portugal)
Recipients of the Meritorious Service Decoration
Victims of the Smolensk air disaster
Polish officials of the United Nations
People from Nowy Sącz County
Adam Mickiewicz University in Poznań alumni